The Unconstitutionality of Slavery (1845) was a book by American abolitionist Lysander Spooner advocating the view that the United States Constitution prohibited slavery. This view was advocated in contrast to that of William Lloyd Garrison who advocated opposing the constitution on the grounds that it supported slavery. In the pamphlet, Spooner shows that none of the state governments of the slave states specifically authorized slavery, that the U.S. Constitution contains several clauses that are contradictory with slavery, that slavery was a violation of natural law, and that the intentions of the Constitutional Convention have no legal bearing on the document they created.  Thus, Spooner's position is one that employs original meaning-styled textualism and rejects original intent-styled originalism.

See also
Abolitionist publications

References

External links
 1845 edition
 1860 edition

1845 books
Pamphlets
Abolitionism in the United States
Works about American slavery